Rennyo (1415–1499) was the 8th Monshu (head priest) of the Hongan-ji Temple of the Jōdo Shinshū sect of Buddhism, and descendant of founder Shinran.  Jodo Shinshu Buddhists often referred to as the restorer of the sect ( in Japanese).  He was also known as Shinshō-in (信証院), and posthumously Etō Daishi (慧灯大師).  During the conflict of the Ōnin War and the subsequent warfare that spread throughout Japan, Rennyo was able to unite most of the disparate factions of the Jodo Shinshu sect under the Hongan-ji, reform existing liturgy and practices, and broaden support among different classes of society.  Through Rennyo's efforts, Jodo Shinshu grew to become the largest, most influential Buddhist sect in Japan.

Rennyo is venerated along with Shinran, and liturgical reforms he implemented are still in use today in Jodo Shinshu temples.  Further, Rennyo's letters were compiled and are still recited in Jodo Shinshu liturgy.

Rennyo maintained a complex relationship with the Ikkō-ikki peasant revolts, which were frequently by Shinshu followers, restraining them at times while also teaching and attending to their religious needs.

Biography

Early life 

Born as Hoteimaru, later Kenju, Rennyo was the son of Zonnyō (1396–1457, who later became  the 7th Abbot or Monshu of the Hongan-ji. Rennyo was born out of wedlock when his father was 18. His mother, a servant whose name is now unknown, was sent away when Rennyo was only six years old. Several times throughout his life he attempted to find her, with no result. 

Rennyo frequently quarreled with his stepmother, Nyoen (d. 1460), and she attempted to have her own son, Ogen (1433–1503), installed as the successor to the abbacy of Hongan-ji.  However, Rennyo's influential uncle, Nyojo (1402–1460), dismissed the idea and Rennyo ultimately succeeded as 8th Monshu.

Early Ministry 

Following his installation as 8th head priest at Hongan-ji in 1457, Rennyo focused his efforts in proselytizing in Ōmi Province, an area dominated by the Bukkō-ji and Kinshoku-ji branches of Shinshū. Due to timely support from the Katada congregation, Rennyo was able to expand the Honganji's presence.  These congregations in Omi Province were frequently composed of artisan-class followers, who were able to provide crucial funds and protection. During his early ministry Rennyo would frequently distribute religious texts to congregations as well as inscriptions of the nenbutsu (recitation of Amitābha Buddha's name).  These inscriptions frequently used the so-called "10-character nembutsu" or  :

Soon Rennyo's influence spread into Mikawa Province, an area traditionally dominated by the Senju-ji branch of Shinshū. He did this by making many appearances in these areas and presenting groups with his own commentaries on Shinran's works.

The monks of the Enryaku-ji (the head temple of the Tendai School located on Mt. Hiei) noticed Rennyo's successes in the provinces around Kyoto. In 1465, Mt. Hiei sent a band of sōhei (warrior monks) to the Hongan-ji and destroyed most of the temple complex. The attacks were justified by claims that the Jōdo Shinshū movement was heretical. The actual motivation for these attacks was likely financial. Mt. Hiei had significant interests in Ōmi Province that included properties and businesses, and felt they needed to prevent Jōdo Shinshū's growth before they felt the economic effects. However, due to the wealth of the congregations Rennyo had converted in the area, enough money was raised to bribe the Mt. Hiei warriors in exchange for peace. The contingency to this was that Hongan-ji must become a member of Mt. Hiei's temples, thus entering them into yearly dues they had to pay Mt. Hiei. Rennyo was very nervous during this period, for just when Hongan-ji was at the pinnacle of uniting the disbanded factions of Shinran, Mt. Hiei reduced the Ōmi temple to rubble.

In any case, the Hongan-ji was almost entirely destroyed before armed men from the Takada congregation were able to chase away the attackers. According to one account, Rennyo was able to fleet at the last minute due to timely assistance from a cooper who saw the attackers coming, and led Rennyo out through the back.

The years immediately following the attack of 1465 forced Rennyo to live a nomadic life. Shortly after he settled among the Katada community, Mt. Hiei threatened to attack again and he fled again until he took refuge under Mii-dera, a powerful rival temple to Mt. Hiei (ironically, both Tendai sect).  However, this protection was not enough, and Mt. Hiei attacked the Takada congregation, forcing Rennyo to move further.  Due to the Ōnin War in Japan, the central government was unable to restrain Mt. Hiei and its monastic army. He could not depend on any outside forces to protect his congregations. None of this stopped Rennyo's mission, as he continued to amass more converts in new areas such as Settsu Province and Yoshino Province. In 1469 he would make a trip to the Kantō region, where he found the Shinshu orders there open to his new and refreshing teachings. This was despite the fact that Senjuji dominated the region.

Flight to Hokuriku and Recovery 

When pondering where to rebuild Hongan-ji, Rennyo made a pivotal move and decided to build it as far away from the influence of Mt. Hiei as possible, by rebuilding the Hongan-ji in Echizen Province (present-day Fukui Prefecture), at a village called Yoshizaki (吉崎).  This was a remote area conveniently located near a coastal route, with a number of Jodo Shinshu congregations from other sects already present.  Rennyo initially proselytized to these congregations in the form of speaking tours, but eventually shifted toward pastoral letters.  Many of the letters later compiled by Rennyo's followers date from this period of time.  These letters proved effective because they were written in clear, comprehensible Japanese, could be read before a congregation, and were effective in clarifying the meaning of Shinran's original teachings.

When Rennyo did visit congregations, he would often sit among the congregation rather than on the raised dais, earning him further respect.

Meanwhile, Rennyo sought to curb some of the more egregious behavior of Shinshu followers in order to improve their standing in the larger Buddhist community.  He instituted  which included such items as:
 Not to slander the teachings of other schools (rule No. 2)
 Not to proclaim Jodo Shinshu teachings while adding other teachings outside the tradition (rule No. 5)
 Not to denigrate the provincial governor or constable (rule No. 6)
 Not to eat fish or fowl during services. (rule No. 9)
 Not to indulge in gambling. (rule No. 11)

The congregation became so big that along the way to the new Hongan-ji there were hundreds of lodges set up and run by Shinshū priests to lodge the travelers.

However, as Rennyo drew more followers, including lower-ranking samurai, he became embroiled in a power-struggle in Kaga Province between two brothers of the Togashi family.  These followers, who banded together to form the Ikkō-ikki movement, sided with Togashi Masachika in 1473, though they eventually turned on him by 1488.  Rennyo kept a delicate balance by maintaining positive relationships with the ruling Ashikaga shogunate in Kyoto and exhorting followers to follow proper conduct in civil society, while at the same time, ministering to the congregation and protecting them from governmental wrath when they rebelled against the authorities.

Return to Kyoto 

By 1475, Rennyo returned to the Kyoto provinces with such a following that Mt. Hiei could no longer pose a credible threat to Jōdo Shinshū again. Rennyo had secured such status in the Jōdo Shinshū ranks that he had to begin issuing pastoral letters (or, ofumi) in place of appearances to congregations.

During this time, Rennyo established a new form of liturgy (gongyō), incorporating elements that would eventually become the core of Honganji Jōdo Shinshū Buddhism. He also rewrote many Buddhist texts into kana, the simple, phonetic Japanese characters, making the texts more accessible for the common person. In 1496, Rennyo sought solitude and retired to a rural area at the mouth of the Yodo River, where he built a small hermitage. The area was known for its "long slope," or "Ō-saka" (大阪) in Japanese. Contemporary documents about Rennyo's life and his hermitage were thus the first to refer to this place by the name Osaka. Rennyo's isolation did not last long, however; his hermitage grew quickly into a temple and surrounding temple town (jinaimachi) as devotees gathered to pay him homage and to hear his teachings. By the time of Rennyo's death three years later (in 1499), the complex had come to be known as the Ishiyama Hongan-ji, and was close to the final shape which would prove to be the greatest fortified temple in Japanese history.

Teachings 

Rennyo believed he was restoring his ancestor Shinran's original teachings, which he summed up in a short creed known as the :

The Ryogemon is still recited in modern-day Shinshu liturgy as a summation of Jodo Shinshu beliefs.

However, Rennyo's teaching also differed from Shinran's in subtle ways:
 Rennyo frequently used the term  alongside the term  that Shinran used.
 Rennyo de-emphasized the prohibition against veneration of Shinto kami, and taught they were manifestations of the Buddhas and Bodhisattvas in keeping with medieval Japanese viewpoints.
 Rennyo further elaborated on the notion of kihō ittai (機法一体), whereby the deluded person is united with Amida Buddha through the nembutsu.
 Rennyo emphasized the notion of "gratitude", such that every invocation of the nembutsu after the first one expressed gratitude at being assured rebirth in the Pure Land of Amitabha Buddha.  In his letters, he described this as

Writings and Liturgy 

The Shoshinge is the primary liturgy used in Jodo Shinshu services, apart from Buddhist sutras, and is recited every morning at 6:00 at the Nishi Honganji temple services.

Further, Rennyo Shonin was the author of several works relating to Jōdo Shinshū doctrine. This letter is frequently read aloud during Jōdo Shinshū funeral services.

Legacy 

Such was Rennyo's importance in reviving Shinran's teachings that he is revered by devotees as the "second founder" of the Jōdo Shinshū tradition.  For example, Rennyo's image is typically venerated in Jodo Shinshu shrines to the left of Amitābha Buddha (while Shinran is usually enshrined to the right).

Rennyo is credited with bringing Jodo Shinshu teachings to a wider audience through proselytization, and also through his letters, which provided accessible, clear explanations of Shinshu doctrine in comparison to Shinran's writings, which are in Classical Chinese.  Rennyo clarified Shinran's teachings, provided a simple code of conduct, and reformed the temple hierarchy and liturgy.

There is debate among scholars belonging to the sect as to whether Rennyo's legacy was good for the Jōdo Shinshū or not. On the one hand, Rennyo gave the disorganized Shinshū movement a coherent structure, translated Shinran's teachings into simpler language, and developed a common liturgy. On the other hand, the process of institutionalization that Rennyo accelerated arguably departed from Shinshū's original egalitarianism, and led to a disjunction between priest-scholars and lay devotees contrary to Shinran's intentions.  Rennyo also introduced certain doctrinal elements from the rival Seizan Jōdo Shū tradition into the Shinshū, and tolerated Shinto belief in kami to a greater extent than Shinran had.

Jodo Shinshu sects that have remained independent of the Honganji, such as the Senju-ji sect, do not recognize Rennyo's reforms and innovations.
 
His 500th memorial service was observed in 1998.
(- see Dobbins & Rogers references below.)

References

Bibliography
 Sansom, George Bailey. (1958).  A History of Japan to 1334. Stanford: Stanford University Press. ; 
 Dobbins, James C. (1989). Jodo Shinshu: Shin Buddhism in Medieval Japan. Bloomington, Illinois: Indiana University Press. ;  OCLC 470742039
Rogers, Minor and Ann (1991), Rennyo: The Second Founder of Shin Buddhism: with a Translation of his Letters, Berkeley, Calif.: Asian Humanities Press, 
Blum, Mark L. and Yasutomi Shin'ya, ed. (2006). Rennyo and the Roots of Modern Japanese Buddhism. Oxford University Press.
 Ducor, Jérôme (1998). "La vie de Rennyo (1415–1499)"; The Rennyo Shônin Reader (ed. by Institute of Jodo-Shinshu Studies and Hongwanji International Center; Kyoto, Jōdo-Shinshū Hongwanji-ha International Center, 1998), p. 57–90.
 Shojun Bandō, Harold Stewart, Ann T. Rogers, Minor L. Rogers (trans.):  Tannishō: Passages Deploring Deviations of Faith and Rennyo Shōnin Ofumi: The Letters of Rennyo, Berkeley: Numata Center for Buddhist Translation and Research 1996. 
 Elson Snow, trans. (1994). Goichidaiki-kikigaki: Sayings of Rennyo Shonin, Pacific World Journal, New Series, Number 10, 1–55

External links
 Tanaka, Kenneth K., trans. Rennyo Shonin's Shoshinge Tai'i: The Main Import of Shoshinge. A Commentary on Shinran Shonin's Verses on True Shinjin
Kyoto National Museum (website, 1998) "Rennyo and Hongan-ji: History and Fine Arts." Accessed 30 Dec 2004.

 
1415 births
1499 deaths
15th-century Japanese people
Japanese religious leaders
Japanese warrior monks
People related to Jōdo Shinshū